The Rush Royale 31 is a French sailboat that was designed by Ron Holland as a racer and first built in 1979.

The design is a development of the Rush 31 and one of many boats based on that same hull.

Production
The design was built by Jeanneau in France from 1979 until 1984, but it is now out of production.

Design
The Rush Royale 31 is a racing keelboat, built predominantly of fiberglass, with wood trim. It has a fractional sloop rig, a raked stem, a reverse transom, an internally mounted spade-type rudder and a fixed fin keel. It displaces  and carries  of lead ballast.

The fuel tank holds .

For sailing downwind the design may be equipped with a symmetrical spinnaker.

Operational history
Sailboat Lab notes, "the Rush Royale 31 Jeanneau is a light sailboat which is a good performer. It is stable / stiff and has a low righting capability if capsized. It is best suited as a day-boat. The fuel capacity is originally very small."

See also
List of sailing boat types

Related development
Rush 31

References

Keelboats
1970s sailboat type designs
Sailing yachts
Sailboat type designs by Ron Holland
Sailboat types built by Jeanneau